Fighter Squadron Composite 204 (VFC-204), also known as the "River Rattlers", is a United States Navy Reserve adversary squadron, slated to fly the F-5N/F Tiger II after having previously flown the F/A-18C/D Hornet. The squadron is based out of Naval Air Station Joint Reserve Base New Orleans, Louisiana, and is part of the U.S. Navy Reserve's Tactical Support Wing. Their radio callsign is "River" and their tail code is "AF".

Squadron insignia and nickname
The squadron’s insignia and nickname River Rattlers were approved by Chief of Naval Operations on 31 August 1970.

History

1970s

Attack Squadron 204 (VA-204) was established at NAS Memphis, Tennessee on 1 July 1970, flying the A-4C Skyhawk as part of a reorganization intended to increase the combat readiness of the Naval Air Reserve Force. The squadron was assigned to Carrier Air Wing Reserve 20 (CVWR-20).

VA-204 won back to back CVWR-20 Bombing Derbies in 1971 and 1972. In May 1972, the squadron participated in exercise Exotic Dancer V, designed to test multiservice operations under a unified command organization. VA-204 received the CNO annual Safety Award for 1973, in recognition of over 5,000 hours of accident free flying for the year. In 1975, the squadron won the F. Trubee Davison Award as the "Best Tailhook Squadron in the Naval Reserve"

The squadron was directed to cease flight operations in December 1977 and transfer all A-4 aircraft in custody. In complying with that directive, VA-204 closed the final chapter in the United States Navy's single seat Skyhawk attack aviation era. In March 1978, the squadron moved from NAS Memphis to NAS New Orleans and began receiving A-7B Corsair II aircraft.

1980s

In 1980 the squadron completed numerous deployments ranging from Exercise Safe Passage, a combined NATO forces exercise conducted near NAS Bermuda in the Western Atlantic, to detachments at NAS Fallon. VA-204 again was selected as the winner of the CNO Safety Award for 1980.

The squadron earned the CNO Safety Award again in 1982 and 1983, and was nominated for the Noel Davis (Battle "E") in 1983. In 1984 the squadron won the CVWR-20 Golden Wrench Award and the Battle "E".

1990s
VA-204 transitioned to the F/A-18A Hornet in April 1991 and was redesignated Strike Fighter Squadron 204 (VFA-204) on 1 May 1991.

In 1992, the squadron conducted numerous detachments to NAS Cecil Field, Florida; NAS Fallon, Nevada; and NAS Key West, Florida. In June the same year, the squadron led an air wing mine warfare exercise. In November the squadron qualified 16 pilots aboard USS Dwight D. Eisenhower.

The squadron officially completed its transition to the F/A-18 Hornet in March 1993, and the next month began initial adversary training at NAS Oceana, Virginia. In October the squadron became the first Reserve Strike Fighter Squadron to provide adversary support to the active duty fleet during a one-week detachment to NAS Key West. In 1993, VFA-204 received its sixth CNO Safety Award, completing 13 years and 50,000 Class-A mishap free flight hours.

In addition, the squadron received their second F. Trubee Davison Award as 'Best Tailhook Squadron in the Naval Reserve'.

The Navy and Marine Corps Meritorious Unit Commendation was awarded to the squadron in 1995 for its successful transition from the A-7E to the F/A-18. In a February detachment to NAS Fallon, VFA-204 expended a record 302 tons of ordnance, smashing the squadron's old record of 128 tons delivered at Fallon in 1993.

During the summer of 1996, the squadron embarked in then what was the Navy's newest carrier, . This detachment included the first ever night cyclic operations for the River Rattlers and another live fire missile exercise in the Virginia operations area.

2000s

Following the disestablishment of CVWR-20, VFA-204 continued to provide Fleet services as part of the Tactical Support Wing. The squadron provided adversary support in simulated fighter combat as well as large multi-plane strike exercises. The primary customers for this adversary support are the Navy's Fleet Replacement Squadrons  (FRS's) which train new pilots to fly the F/A-18E/F Super Hornet or the F/A-18A/C Hornet.  VFA-204 provides this service by sending aircraft and personnel away on detachment, normally to either NAS Key West or NAS Fallon.

VFA-204 also maintained the capability to mobilize to provide the Fleet with an additional combat ready F/A-18 Hornet squadron, should the need arise. To this end, the squadron routinely trained to the latest Strike Fighter mission employment tactics and occasionally conducts aircraft carrier landing qualifications. The squadron prepared for carrier qualifications by conducting Field Carrier Landing Practice (FCLP's) at their home field. FCLP's involve numerous "touch and go" landings on a runway area painted to resemble a carrier flight deck. Adjacent to the runway is a standard aircraft carrier Optical Landing System fresnel lens. Each landing is observed and graded by a Landing Signal Officer, a pilot who has been trained in the subspecialty of teaching aviators how to safely land on an aircraft carrier.

2020s
In April 2022, plans emerged that VFA-204 would be redesignated Fighter Squadron Composite 204 (VFC-204) in October 2022 and that the squadron is slated to transition to the F-5N/F Tiger II, with the required aircraft being transferred from VFC-13, another Navy adversary squadron. The NAS Fallon, Nevada based VFC-13 will in turn receive recently retired F-16 Fighting Falcons from the U.S. Air Force.

As of 1 November 2022, the squadron has been redesignated Fighter Squadron Composite 204 (VFC-204).

In popular culture
VFA-204 made several appearances in the 2003 film Tears of the Sun starring Bruce Willis. In the film, the squadron flies several F/A-18A Hornets from the  alongside several SH-60B Seahawk helicopters from HSL-37 stationed in Hawaii. The weapons seen being fired during the film were also done with special effects and pyrotechnics, not actual AGM-84E SLAM Standoff Land Attack Missiles.

See also
Naval aviation
Modern US Navy carrier air operations
List of United States Navy aircraft squadrons
List of Inactive United States Navy aircraft squadrons

References

External links
VFA-204 @ Globalsecurity.org

Strike fighter squadrons of the United States Navy